Komba Eric Koedoyoma is a Sierra Leonean politician with the Sierra Leone People's Party. Koedoyoma is a member of parliament representing his hometown of Kono District.

References

Year of birth missing (living people)
Living people
Members of the Parliament of Sierra Leone
Sierra Leone People's Party politicians
People from Kono District